Randall James Briggs, Jr. (born February 27, 1978), credited professionally as James R. Briggs, Jr., is an American musician, best known as the keyboardist for the California rock band The Aquabats, of which he has been a member since 1996 under the stage name and persona of Jimmy the Robot. Briggs also portrayed this role on The Aquabats' 2012-2014 television series The Aquabats! Super Show! and again on its 2019 YouTube revival series The Aquabats! RadVentures!.

Biography
Briggs joined The Aquabats in 1996, at the age of 18. In addition to keyboards, Briggs also contributed tenor saxophone to much of the band's music, up until the departure of trumpeters Catboy and Prince Adam in the early 2000s led to the band's decision to continue without a horn section, transitioning Briggs' role in the band entirely to keyboards and synthesizers, performing solo saxophone parts only on select songs for The Aquabats' live shows.

Briggs' original stage name, as credited in the liner notes for The Fury of The Aquabats!, was "Jaime the Robot", "Jaime" being a Spanish-language twist on the name Jimmy, given to him by fellow Aquabat Catboy. In 1998, while The Aquabats were developing a television pilot with Buena Vista Television, Briggs' name was changed to simply "The Robot" to avoid copyright issues with the Get Smart character Hymie the Robot. Briggs kept this title until 2004, when it was changed to his current stage name.

Outside of his work with The Aquabats, Briggs has contributed saxophone to several albums by the indie pop band Bikeride featuring former Aquabats members Adam Deibert and Charles Gray, as well as having contributed saxophone to the Rx Bandits 1997 debut Those Damn Bandits. Outside of The Aquabats, Briggs works for his family's rare coin store, Coop's Coins, in Redlands, California.

Discography

The Aquabats
The Fury of the Aquabats! (1997) - alto, tenor and baritone saxophones, clarinet, piano, vocals, Clavinova, Mellotron, flute
The Aquabats vs. the Floating Eye of Death! (1999) - woodwinds, keyboards, vocals
Myths, Legends and Other Amazing Adventures, Vol. 2 (2000) - keyboards, woodwinds
Yo! Check Out This Ride! EP (2004) - keyboards, backing vocals
Charge!! (2005) - keyboards, vocals
Radio Down! (2010) - keyboards, backing vocals
Hi-Five Soup! (2011) - keyboards, backing vocals
The Aquabats! Super Show! Television Soundtrack: Volume One (2019) - keyboards, lead and backing vocals
Kooky Spooky...In Stereo (2020) - keyboards, saxophone, backing vocals

Bikeride
Thirty-Seven Secrets I Only Told America (1999) - tenor sax (as Randall J. Briggs)
 Summer Winners, Summer Losers (2000) - saxophone (as Randall J. Briggs)
 Morning Macumba (2002) - clarinet, saxophone, backing vocals (as Randall J. Briggs)

Miscellaneous
The Pharmaceutical Bandits - Those Damn Bandits (1997) - saxophone (as Randy Briggs)

References 

1978 births
American rock keyboardists
American rock saxophonists
American male saxophonists
American male television actors
The Aquabats members
Living people
Musicians from California
21st-century American keyboardists
21st-century American saxophonists